Acheux is part of the name of two communes of the Somme department of northern France:

 Acheux-en-Amiénois
 Acheux-en-Vimeu